is a ward of the city of Fukuoka in Fukuoka Prefecture, Japan.

Many of Fukuoka Prefecture and Fukuoka City's principal government, commercial, retail and entertainment establishments are located in the district. Hakata-ku is also the location of Fukuoka's main train station, Hakata Station, Fukuoka Airport and the Hakata Port international passenger ship terminal.

Geography
Hakata-ku is a ward of Fukuoka City located on its eastern edge. It is 31.47 km2 with a population of 206,629 (current January 1, 2009). The northwestern end of the ward faces Hakata Bay, which includes both ferry and international cruise ship terminals . The northeast end of the ward is slightly elevated, and is named , with nearby Fukuoka Airport. Hakata-ku also houses the Fukuoka Prefectural office.

Economy 
Many Japanese companies have established branch offices in Hakata-ku due to its ease of access to local government offices as well transportation hubs such as Hakata Station and Fukuoka Airport. The headquarters of JR Kyūshū, Best Denki, and many other companies are in the ward.

Air Next, a subsidiary of All Nippon Airways, is headquartered on the grounds of Fukuoka Airport in Hakata-ku. Link Airs has its headquarters in the Fukuoka Gion Daiichi Seimei Building (福岡祇園第一生命ビル Fukuoka Gion Daiichi Seimei Biru) in Hakata-ku. Cisco has an Asia-Pacific sales office on the 12th floor of the Fukuoka Gion Daiichi Seimei Building.

Prior to its dissolution, Harlequin Air was headquartered on the grounds of the airport in Hakata-ku.

Hakata's economy was significantly transformed in 1996 with the opening of Canal City Hakata, an award-winning destination shopping and entertainment center.

Cruise ship tourism
From the early 2010s Hakata became the beneficiary of significant growth in cruise ship tourism; particularly with visitors from China.

In 2014, 91 cruise ships travelled from China called at Hakata. In 2015, 245 cruise ship calls were made at Hakata Port. After expansion and redevelopment of the port facilities, the number of cruise ship port calls in 2016 is expected to exceed 400. As of 2015, the largest passenger vessel making regular port calls at Hakata is the Royal Caribbean International owned MS Quantum of the Seas.

Partly as a result of growing international tourism, in 2015 Fukuoka reported the fastest rising tax revenues and population in Japan.

History 
Hakata is one of the oldest cities in Japan. In the Middle Ages Hakata, which faces onto the Genkai-Nada Channel (玄界灘) dividing Japan from Korea, was a base for merchants who traded with China and Korea, and the city housed Japan's first Chinatown. Taira no Kiyomori is said to have built the artificial harbor Sode-no-minato (袖の湊) to increase commerce. Hakata was burned down by many wars, including the Mongol invasions.

In the early Edo period, Kuroda Nagamasa, appointed the lord of Chikuzen Province, and most of his samurai vassals lived in Fukusaki, on the opposite shore of the Naka River from Hakata. Kuroda Nagamasa changed the name of the area to Fukuoka after his home town; Fukuoka in Okayama Prefecture. He ordered Tachibana Castle and Najima Castle dismantled, and had Fukuoka Castle built using the stones from those older castles. At that time Hakata was no larger than one square kilometer, demarcated by defensive lines along the Naka River, the Boshu-bori (or Boshu Canal), and the Ishido or Mikasa River.

In 1876, Hakata, then also known as Dai-Ni-Dai-ku, and Fukuoka, or Dai-Ichi-Dai-ku, were merged. In 1878 the settlement was renamed Fukuoka-ku (福岡区) by the Fukuoka prefectural government, though the population of Hakata was 25,677 and that of Fukuoka was 20,410. At that time, the name Hakata vanished from the administration. In 1889, after a local referendum in which half the voters chose the name Fukuoka and half chose Hakata, the city was officially renamed Fukuoka-shi, but at the same time a new train station then being built was named Hakata Station.

An imperial decree issued in July 1899 established Hakata as an open port for trade with the United States and the United Kingdom.

In 1972, when Fukuoka City was granted designated status by government ordinance, a ward including the old Hakata area was given the name Hakata-ku.

In 2016 a large sinkhole appeared in the city center just west of Hakata station. The sinkhole was filled and the affected roads were completely repaired within a few days. However, the hasty repair seems to have been problematic as less than a month later the road began showing signs of imminent implosion.

Culture 

Hakata was the traditional center for the manufacture of Hakata ningyō, which are traditional Japanese dolls that are famous throughout Japan. Today, almost all Hakata ningyō makers (Hakata ningyō shi) have their factories out of the Old Hakata Area, a part of modern Hakata-ku.

Hakata-ori is a textile used for obi of kimono.

It is also the home of Mentai Rock, named after the popular mentaiko dish served in the region, that spawned numerous J-pop idols during the early 1980s. Neo Mentai Rock is the name given to a recent renewal in activity from local musicians.

Hakata-ben is the local Japanese dialect spoken in the Old Hakata Area.

Hakata is also the location of the pop group HKT48.
Another popular group from Hakata are Kanikapila and NUMBER GIRL.

Parts of the famous crime novel 'Points and lines' ('Ten to Sen' in Japanese) by the award-winning Japanese writer Seichō Matsumoto occur in Hakata and its train station.

The South Korean government maintains the Korea Education Institution in Hakata-ku.

Famous foods 
 Mentaiko
 Tonkotsu (pork bone) ramen, also called simply Hakata ramen
 Motsunabe
 Japanese cheesecake
 Mizutaki - Nabemono of chicken
 Hakata Torimon (:ja:博多通りもん) - a type of cake
 Hakata no Hito - a type of cake

Tsukemen (dipping noodles)

Festivals 
Hakata Dontaku Minato Matsuri - May 3 and 4
Hakata Gion Yamakasa - from July 1 to 15
Hakata O-kunchi - October 23 and 24 (prior to 1953, November 23)

Transportation

Rail 
JR West
Sanyō Shinkansen
Hakata Station
JR Kyūshū
Kyūshū Shinkansen
Hakata Station
Kagoshima Main Line
Yoshizuka Station - Hakata Station - Takeshita Station - Minami-Fukuoka Station
Sasaguri Line
Yoshizuka Station
Nishi-Nippon Railroad
Tenjin Ōmuta Line
Zasshonokuma Station
Fukuoka City Subway
Kūkō Line
Nakasu-Kawabata Station - Gion Station - Hakata Station - Higashi-Hie Station - Fukuokakūkō Station (Fukuoka Airport)
Hakozaki Line
Nakasu-Kawabata Station - Gofukumachi Station - Chiyo-Kenchōguchi Station

Bus 
Hakata bus terminus (see Nishitetsu)

Airport 
Fukuoka Airport

Harbor 
Bayside place Hakata Futoh (Hakata Pier)
Chūō Wharf (Central Wharf) - international ferry Beetle and Kobee and New Camellia

Facilities

Commerce 
Canal City Hakata
Grand Hyatt Fukuoka
Hakata Riverain
Hakata-za
Hotel Ōkura Fukuoka

Culture 
Level-5 stadium (Hakata no mori Stadium)
Fukuoka Convention Center - Marine Messe Fukuoka, Fukuoka International Congress Center, Fukuoka Kokusai Center
Hakata Civic Center, Hakata Library
Hakata South Library
Nakasu
Rakusui-en

References

External links
Hakata ward official website(Japanese)

Wards of Fukuoka